David I. Steinberg (born 1928) is an American historian, currently Distinguished Professor of Asian Studies, and previously Distinguished Professor of Korean Studies, at Georgetown University. He is the author of the 2009 book "Burma / Myanmar: What Everyone Needs to Know"

References

Georgetown University faculty
21st-century American historians
21st-century American male writers
1928 births
Dartmouth College alumni
Harvard University alumni
Living people
American male non-fiction writers